The 1970 Villanova Wildcats football team represented the Villanova University during the 1970 NCAA University Division football season. The head coach was Lou Ferry, coaching his first season with the Wildcats. The team played their home games at Villanova Stadium in Villanova, Pennsylvania.

Schedule

Roster

References

Villanova
Villanova Wildcats football seasons
Villanova Wildcats football